Sigona is an Italian surname, originally from Sicily. Notable people with the surname include:

Carmelo Sigona (born 1968), American graffiti artist
José Sigona Torres (born 1953), Mexican politician
 Nando Sigona (born 1975), Italian social scientist and academic

Italian-language surnames